East, West, East: The Final Sprint is an Albanian comedy film directed by Gjergj Xhuvani. The film is about an amateur cycling team from Albania that learns while on their way to France to take part in a tournament that a revolution is underway in Albania.

Awards
The film was selected as the Albanian entry for the Best Foreign Language Film at the 83rd Academy Awards, but it didn't make the January shortlist.

Gjergj Xhuvani won the Best Director award at the Tirana Film Festival.

See also
 List of submissions to the 83rd Academy Awards for Best Foreign Language Film
 List of Albanian submissions for the Academy Award for Best Foreign Language Film

References

External links
 

2009 films
Albanian-language films
Italian comedy films
2000s Italian-language films
2009 comedy films
Cycling films
Albanian comedy films